Robinson Crusoe is a 1997 American adventure survival drama film directed by Rod Hardy and George T. Miller, and starring Pierce Brosnan in the titular role, based on Daniel Defoe's 1719 novel Robinson Crusoe.

Plot
The film opens to a fictionalized Daniel Defoe being offered to read a castaway's autobiography. He grudgingly obliges and begins to get engrossed in the narrative.

Robinson Crusoe (Pierce Brosnan) is a Scottish gentleman with experience in the Royal Navy and the British army. He accidentally kills his lifelong friend Patrick (Damian Lewis) in a duel over his childhood love Mary. Patrick's brothers arrive and threaten Crusoe, but his page manages to buy time for an escape. Fleeing back to Mary, Crusoe subsequently ends up leaving for a year so that Mary can attempt to smooth over relations with Patrick's family.

Crusoe joins the merchant marine transporting assorted cargoes between ports in the Pacific, Indian and Atlantic oceans. He chronicles the ship's journeys at the behest of the captain until a typhoon shipwrecks him near the coast of New Guinea.

On his first day ashore on the island he buries other crew members who had washed up on the surrounding beaches. The next day he heads to the ship, which has beached itself on a reef. He salvages tools, supplies and weapons from the ship. Crusoe also frees the captain's corgi Skipper from a supply room. Crusoe begins to acclimate himself to the island while hoping for a passing European ship. One day a ship finally appears, but Crusoe notices it too late to be rescued. Crusoe resolves to acclimate himself to the island and moves inland, building a shelter and growing food.

One day he hears ominous drums and human voices. Investigating the noises he finds a tribe from a nearby island making human sacrifices. After two prisoners have been sacrificed Crusoe intervenes by firing his weapon, which allows the third prisoner (played by William Takaku) to escape. Later he meets the escaped native and attempts to befriend him. Cultural and language barriers prevent him from communicating before they are attacked by a group of the tribesmen. He witnesses the native cut out the heart of a defeated enemy and calls him a savage heathen before fleeing to his shelter and preparing a defence.

Days later Crusoe falls into a snare laid by the native. Crusoe communicates the danger and potency of his firearms on a bat, which allows them to begin communicating. He names the man Friday and has himself referred to as Master. Within six months Friday has learned the basics of English, but when Crusoe attempts to convert him to Christianity, Friday refuses and an argument ensues. Friday separates himself from Crusoe. Missing the companionship, Crusoe attempts to make peace with Friday.

Reunited, the two set a trap for the tribe of natives who attempted to sacrifice Friday before. Once they arrive Crusoe lights a fuse leading to a load of gunpowder, but Skipper chases after the lit fuse and also dies in the explosion. At Skipper's funeral Crusoe gains a deeper appreciation for Friday's religion.

Later Crusoe decides they must leave the island due to an impending attack by the native tribe. Friday mentions that he has heard of New Britain. He says he cannot take Crusoe to his home island because he is considered dead for being a sacrifice and he cannot go to New Britain because the Europeans enslave his people. Friday subsequently learns that "Master" is not Crusoe's real name, but an indicator of enslavement and once again leaves Crusoe, who subsequently attempts to build a canoe to get to New Britain by himself.

A typhoon arrives while Crusoe has nearly finished his boat. Friday returns and accepts that Crusoe had decided not to make him a slave. The two attempt to salvage their crops and wildlife, but the typhoon destroys them – as well as Crusoe's canoe. The pair set traps to defend the island, but expect to die in the defense.

The tribesmen arrive in force. Crusoe and Friday manage to defend the island, but Crusoe is shot by an arrow. Friday decides to try to save Crusoe by taking him to his home island. Upon arriving there Friday's tribe capture Crusoe, believing him to have come to enslave the people. They force Crusoe to fight Friday to the death for his freedom. After sparing Friday, Crusoe demands his friend kill him so that he may live. Suddenly, a group of European slavers arrive, killing Friday. Crusoe is rescued, but is devastated by Friday's death. The slavers tend to Crusoe's wounds, and bring him to Lisbon. From there, he sails home, and is reunited with Mary.

Daniel Defoe tells his publisher that he must write Crusoe's story.

Cast 
 Pierce Brosnan as Robinson Crusoe
 William Takaku as Man Friday
 Polly Walker as Mary McGregor
 Ian Hart as Daniel Defoe
 James Frain as Robert, Defoe's Publisher
 Damian Lewis as Patrick Connor
 Ben Robertson as James, Patrick's Brother
 Martin Grace as Captain Braga
 Sean Brosnan as Cabin boy
 Lysette Anthony as Mrs. Crusoe
 Tim McMulian as Crusoe's Second
 Mal Tobias as Patrick Connor's Second
 Jim Clark as Slave Ship Captain

Reception
Due to a very limited release, never debuting theatrically in the United States or United Kingdom, the film did not receive any widespread press or critical attention. Among the few reviews available, Radio Times gave it two stars, finding Brosnan 'unconvincing' in the lead role. DVD Talk praised Brosnan's performance, but felt that the pacing was too fast and did not allow for proper immersion.

References

External links
 
 

1997 films
1990s adventure drama films
American adventure drama films
Films about survivors of seafaring accidents or incidents
Films based on Robinson Crusoe
Films directed by George T. Miller
Films directed by Rod Hardy
Films set on beaches
Films set on islands
Films set in jungles
Films set in Papua New Guinea
Films set in the 18th century
American survival films
Touchstone Pictures films
Miramax films
1997 drama films
1990s English-language films
1990s American films